Ronald "J.J." Henry III (born April 2, 1975) is an American professional golfer who plays on the PGA Tour.

Amateur career 
Henry was born in Fairfield, Connecticut. While attending Texas Christian University, he was the individual runner up at the 1998 NCAA Division I Men's Golf Championships.

Professional career 
Henry turned pro in 1998. He joined the Nationwide Tour in 1999 and after winning the 2000 Buy.com Knoxville Open moved up to the PGA Tour in 2001. His first PGA Tour win came in 2006 at the Buick Championship. He played on the 2006 Ryder Cup team, halving all three matches he was involved in.

Henry came close at the 2012 Byron Nelson Championship where he had one-shot lead with two holes to play. A double bogey on the 71st hole resulted in him eventually finishing two strokes behind winner Jason Dufner. Later in the year, Henry won for the second time on the PGA Tour at the Reno–Tahoe Open. The event used the modified Stableford scoring system and Henry prevailed by one point over Brazilian Alexandre Rocha. He earned entry into the PGA Championship the following week.

After finishing 158th in the 2018 FedEx Cup, Henry became the first player to take advantage of a one-time PGA Tour exemption for those who made at least 300 cuts, six priority positions higher than the past champions category.

Personal life 
Henry lives with his wife Lee and his two children in Fort Worth, Texas.

Philanthropic endeavors
In 2006, Henry founded the Henry House Foundation, a non-profit organization with a mission to generate public awareness and to support community-based programs that focus on the healthcare and well-being of children in the community. The foundation makes donations to fund specific, tangible projects initiated by children's medical and support services and organizations in Fort Worth and Southern New England.

Amateur wins
1994 Connecticut Amateur
1995 Connecticut Amateur
1998 New England Amateur, Connecticut Amateur

Professional wins (5)

PGA Tour wins (3)

PGA Tour playoff record (1–0)

Buy.com Tour wins (1)

Other wins (1)

Results in major championships

CUT = missed the half-way cut
"T" = tie

Summary

Most consecutive cuts made – 4 (2006 PGA – 2007 Open Championship)
Longest streak of top-10s – 0

Results in The Players Championship

CUT = missed the halfway cut
"T" indicates a tie for a place

Results in World Golf Championships

QF, R16, R32, R64 = Round in which player lost in match play
"T" = Tied

U.S. national team appearances
Amateur
Palmer Cup: 1998 (tie)

Professional
Ryder Cup: 2006
World Cup: 2006

See also
2000 Buy.com Tour graduates
2014 Web.com Tour Finals graduates

References

External links

Henry House Foundation

American male golfers
TCU Horned Frogs men's golfers
PGA Tour golfers
Ryder Cup competitors for the United States
Korn Ferry Tour graduates
Golfers from Connecticut
Golfers from Texas
Sportspeople from Fairfield, Connecticut
Sportspeople from Fort Worth, Texas
1975 births
Living people